John Malbon Thompson (24 December 1830 – 30 May 1908) was an Australian lawyer and politician, member of the Queensland Legislative Assembly.

Early life
Thompson was the son of John Thompson, sometime Deputy Surveyor-General for New South Wales, by his marriage with the daughter of Charles Windeyer. He was born in Sydney and educated at William Timothy Cape's Grammar School.

Career
Thompson was admitted an attorney and solicitor of the Supreme Court of New South Wales in 1855, and removing to Queensland, where he was admitted to the bar in June 1880, practised at Ipswich, Queensland, for which town he was returned to the Assembly in 1868. Whilst representing this constituency he was Chairman of Committees for two years, Secretary for Lands in the Arthur Palmer Ministry from May 1870 to July 1873, and Secretary for Public Works from the latter date till January 1874, when the Government retired. He was Minister of Justice and Queensland in the first Thomas McIlwraith ministry from January to May 1879. During his tenure of office as Minister of Lands he carried the Homestead Areas Bill, and did a good deal to stop the "dummying" of the State lands. Thompson wife's health worsened, he resigned from parliament on 27 August 1881 and resumed the practice of his profession as a solicitor in Sydney. Thompson married Mary Harriett Montague Russell on 9 December 1896.

References

1830 births
1908 deaths
Members of the Queensland Legislative Assembly
Attorneys-General of Queensland
Colony of Queensland people
19th-century Australian politicians